Grex or GREX may refer to:

 Grex (biology), a multicellular aggregate of amoeba of the phyla Acrasiomycota or Dictyosteliomycota
 Grex (horticulture), (pl. greges) a kind of group used in horticultural nomenclature applied to the progeny of an artificial cross from specified parents
 Formerly used to mean species aggregate
 Georgetown Rail Equipment Company, a provider of railway maintenance equipment and related services based in Georgetown, Texas